Aleksa Stepanović (born 2 June 1998) is a Serbian professional basketball player for FMP of the Adriatic League and the Basketball League of Serbia.

Playing career 
A power forward, Stepanović played for Spars Sarajevo, Dynamic Belgrade, Metalac, and Sloboda Užice prior he signed for Partizan in May 2021. In July 2021, he signed a three-year contract extension with Partizan. In November 2021, he parted ways with Partizan. On 16 November 2021, he signed a three-year contract with FMP.

National team career 
In December 2016, Stepanović was a member of the Serbian U-18 national team that finished 10th at the FIBA U18 European Championship in Samsun, Turkey. Over three tournament games, he averaged 1.3 points and 1.3 rebounds per game. In July 2017, Stepanović was a member of the Serbian U-20 national team that finished 5th at the FIBA U20 European Championship in Greece. Over five tournament games, he averaged two points, 2.2 rebounds, and 0.8 assists per game. In July 2018, he was a member of the U-20 team that finished 6th at the European Championship in Chemnitz, Germany. Over five tournament games, he averaged 3.1 points, 1.4 rebounds, and 0.4 assists per game.

References

External links 
 Player Profile at eurobasket.com
 Player Profile at realgm.com
 Player Profile at proballers.com
 Player Profile at aba-liga.com

1998 births
Living people
ABA League players
Basketball League of Serbia players
Basketball players from Niš
KK Dynamic players
KK FMP players
KK Metalac Valjevo players
KK Sloboda Užice players
KK Partizan players
OKK Spars players
Serbian expatriate basketball people in Bosnia and Herzegovina
Serbian men's basketball players
Power forwards (basketball)